Westport is a hamlet and census-designated place (CDP) in the town of Westport in Essex County, New York, United States. The population of the CDP was 518 at the 2010 census, or 39.4% of the total population of the town of Westport.

Geography
Westport hamlet is located in the center of the town of Westport, at the outflow of Hoisington Brook into North West Bay of Lake Champlain. The CDP extends north along the shore of the lake as far as Cove Lane and south to Maple Way. The western edge of the CDP is formed by the Delaware and Hudson Railway line and by Hammond Brook.

New York State Routes 9N and 22 intersect in the center of the hamlet.

Demographics

References

Census-designated places in New York (state)
Census-designated places in Essex County, New York